Alexandru Ioan Cuza National College is one of the two most important high schools in Focșani, Vrancea County, Romania. It was founded in 1864, after Alexandru Ioan Cuza, the first Domnitor of the United Principalities of Moldavia and Wallachia, enacted a Law on Education, establishing tuition-free and compulsory public education for primary schools.

The main building dates to 1930–1931. It is listed as a historic monument by Romania's Ministry of Culture and Religious Affairs.

Notes

External links
  Official site

Schools in Vrancea County
National Colleges in Romania
Buildings and structures in Focșani
Educational institutions established in 1864
1864 establishments in Romania
Historic monuments in Vrancea County
School buildings completed in 1931